Capellen is a canton in southwestern Luxembourg. Its capital is Capellen (in the commune of Mamer).

Administrative divisions
Capellen Canton consists of the following nine communes:

 Dippach
 Garnich
 Habscht
 Käerjeng
 Kehlen
 Koerich
 Kopstal
 Mamer
 Steinfort

Mergers
 On 1 January 2012 the former communes of Bascharage and Clemency (both from Capellen Canton) were merged to create the commune of Käerjeng.  The law creating Käerjeng was passed on 24 May 2011.
 On 1 January 2018 the former communes of Hobscheid and Septfontaines (both from Capellen Canton) were merged to create the commune of Habscht.  The law creating Habscht was passed on 24 December 2017.

Population

References

 
Cantons of Luxembourg